The 1952–53 NBA season was the Hawks' fourth season in the NBA and second season in Milwaukee.

Offseason

Draft picks

Roster

Regular season

Season standings

x – clinched playoff spot

Record vs. opponents

Game log

Player statistics

Season

Awards and records

Transactions

References

See also
1952-53 NBA season

Atlanta Hawks seasons
Milk
Milwaukee Hawks
Milwaukee Hawks